Hits 50 is a compilation album released in the United Kingdom in August 2001. It contains 50 tracks spread over two CDs, including ten number-one singles on the UK Singles Chart from Five, DJ Pied Piper and the Masters of Ceremonies, Craig David, Jennifer Lopez, Bob The Builder, Rui Da Silva, The Bangles, LeAnn Rimes, A1, and Westlife.

Hits 50 is the first Hits album since Hits 97 and Hits 99 to feature the word Hits in the name as the only word in the title.

Controversy and background
Despite its success, the album was quite controversial - in order to have 25 tracks on a single disc, many of the tracks had to be edited down, although this is not the case on the artwork. Despite this, controversy eventually died down and Hits 51 followed this format for 25 tracks on one disc, with tracks now played in full. The album was released 3 months before Now That's What I Call Music!'s 50th volume, Now 50.

Hits 50 came through after the previous volume's (Music 2 - Summer 2001) was considered somewhat of a commercial failure by BMG UK, so they decided to rebrand the Hits series to its numbering system (there had not been a Hits album with a volume number suffix since 1991).

Track listing
Disc one

Disc two

External links
 Track Listing at Amazon

2001 compilation albums
Hits (compilation series) albums